Bikash Sinha (born 1945) is an Indian physicist, active in the fields of nuclear physics and high energy physics. Bikash Sinha was the director of the Saha Institute of Nuclear Physics and Variable Energy Cyclotron Centre and the chairman of the Board of Governors of the National Institute of Technology, Durgapur in June 2005. He retired from service as the director of Variable Energy Cyclotron Centre and the Saha Institute of Nuclear Physics in June 2009. Presently he is the Homi Bhabha Chair Professor of the Variable Energy Cyclotron Centre. He is also a member of scientific advisory board to the Prime Minister of India. He received Padma Shri in 2001 and Padma Bhushan in 2010.

Biography
Sinha hails from the Royal family of Kandi, Murshidabad. He studied Physics for his bachelor's degree at Presidency College [now University], Kolkata from 1961 to 1964, graduating with high honors. He then proceeded to King's College, Cambridge, for higher studies in his subject. He is the recipient of S.N. Bose Birth Centenary Award of the Indian Science Congress Association in 1994. Sinha joined Bhabha Atomic Research Centre, Mumbai in 1976 after returning from England and was Director of Variable Energy Cyclotron Centre. He is a Fellow of the prestigious Indian National Science Academy as recognition of his outstanding research in Physics (1989).

He is also a Fellow of National Academy of Sciences, Allahabad (1993) and the Indian Academy of Sciences, Bangalore (2004).

Currently, he is the chairman of board of governors, National Institute of Technology, Durgapur (NIT Duragpur).

Sinha was nominated as a member of the Scientific Advisory Council to the Prime Minister from 27 January 2005. He has been re-elected for the second time as a member of the Scientific Advisory Council to the Prime Minister from December 2009.

Honours
Bikash Sinha has been awarded D.A.E. – Dr. Raja Ramanna Prize 2001 and delivered the Pandya Endowment lecture Award, IPA, 2001 and Rais Ahmed Memorial Lecture Award, Aligarh, 2001.

He is a member of the Visva-Bharati University's Academic Council since 2002 and a member of the Senate of Indian Institute of Technology, Kharagpur. He has become the Fellow of the 3rd World Academy of Sciences, Italy, 2002 and Indian Academy of Sciences, Bangalore, 2004. Recently he was elected to the fellowship of the Institute of Physics, UK Bikash Sinha was the Vice-chancellor of West Bengal University of Technology since February 2003 to 18 December 2003 in addition to his regular responsibilities and also a member of the Scientific Advisory Committee to the Cabinet, Govt. of India. Sinha is an indian has been awarded R.D. Birla Award for Excellence in Physics – 2002.

Recently Sinha has been awarded an honorary doctorate in physics from the National Academy of Sciences of Ukraine (2005). The Ministry of Human Resource Development appointed Sinha as the Chairman of the Local Committee of the Indian Institute of Science Education and Research, Kolkata, in June 2005. He was awarded the Humboldt Research Award by the Alexander von Humboldt Foundation, Germany, in November 2005. He was awarded Meghnad Saha Memorial Lecture Award (2007) from The National Academy of Sciences, India, on 28 August 2007 and he was elected as President of the Indian Physics Association in November 2007. He was awarded prestigious "Bidhan Memorial Honor" on 1 July 2008 from Bidhan Memorial Trust, Kolkata. Recently Sinha was appointed a distinguished visiting scholar by the Christ's College, Cambridge in March 2009 and also elected as Fellow of the Institute of Physics, London, the same year.

Bikash Sinha has been conferred Padma Bhushan Award in 2010 for his significant contribution in science and technology. Dr. Sinha has been awarded Honorary Doctorate from National Institute of Technology, Silchar 2010, Burdwan University 2012, Netaji Subhas Open University 2013 and National Institute of Technology Agartala 2013.

References

Indian institute directors
20th-century Indian physicists
Living people
People associated with Santiniketan
Recipients of the Padma Shri in science & engineering
Recipients of the Padma Bhushan in science & engineering
Scottish Church Collegiate School alumni
Presidency University, Kolkata alumni
University of Calcutta alumni
Alumni of the University of Cambridge
Alumni of the University of London
Academic staff of the University of Calcutta
Academics of King's College London
Academic staff of West Bengal University of Technology
1945 births
Bengali Hindus
Scientists from Kolkata
People from Murshidabad district